Bulalacao, officially the Municipality of Bulalacao,  is a 3rd class municipality in the province of Oriental Mindoro, Philippines. According to the 2020 census, it has a population of 44,366 people.

It is formerly known as San Pedro.

History
Don Gabriel Contreras – Gobernadorcillo and Capitan Municipal. One of the rulers of Bulalacao under the Spanish Imperial Crown The territory of Bulalacao was formerly raided by Datu (Prince) Calido of Panay. The Contreras family administered over Bulalacao as Panginoon Basal/Punong Datu before the conquest of Spain. Since the founding of the First Republic, Bulalacao has predominantly been administered by descendants of Don Gabriel Contreras. The lands composing the present Municipality of Bulalacao was previously the hacienda of the Contreras family. Their collateral familial lines (Sejera, Templanza, Fajardo, etc.) also once held vast haciendas throughout the island of Mindoro.

Bulalacao, with a natural harbor, is one of the places theorized by anthropologists and archaeologists to be the location of the ancient wangdom of Ma-i. In the late 1970s, several jade Chinese porcelain vases were found in Bulalacao, further corroborating the theory.

On May 7, 1995, reelectionist Mayor Guillermo Salas was assassinated a day before the 1995 election by Rodel Gonzales of the Mangyan tribe; Gonzales eventually surrendered to authorities five days later, confessing to the crime.

Geography

Climate

Barangays
Bulalacao is politically subdivided into 15 barangays.

Demographics

Economy

Transportation 
Bulalacao has a port that serves as a gateway from Mindoro to Caticlan in Malay, Aklan. FastCat operates in the port.

See also
List of renamed cities and municipalities in the Philippines
List of political families in the Philippines

References

External links

Bulalacao Profile at PhilAtlas.com
Bulalacao, Oriental Mindoro official website
[ Philippine Standard Geographic Code]
Philippine Census Information
Local Governance Performance Management System

Municipalities of Oriental Mindoro